Puli Township is an urban township in Nantou County, Taiwan. The township is located within the Puli Basin. It is the geographic center of Taiwan.

Name
In the 19th century the city was known as Posia or Po-li-sia. The Atayal name of the settlement was Sabaha Bakalas, meaning "house of stars".

History

Spread of Christianity
In 1870, a native of Po-li-sia named Khai-san received treatment for a medical issue in a missionary hospital in Taiwan-fu (present-day Tainan) and learned about Christianity. When he returned home, he spread information about Christianity to the people of the area. In July 1871, two native preachers were sent to the area after reports concerning the spread of Christianity in Po-li-sia were heard of in Taiwan-fu. They reported back that "a movement, favourable to Christianity, had really taken place" in the area. Members of the Canada Presbyterian Mission visited the area in March 1872. In late 1872, William Campbell was part of an armed party that traversed the jungle, mountains and streams between Toa-sia and Po-li-sia to participate in examining candidates for baptism who lived in Po-li-sia.

Chi Chi earthquake
In 1999, this town was damaged by the 921 earthquake. The damage was especially severe in Taomi Village a small rural village located within Puli Township. 10 years on, the village has since re-invented itself to be the pride of Taiwan's eco-tourism industry. Especially after the opening of the Paper Dome, now a major attraction in Puli Township, Taomi Village was transformed from a sleepy agricultural village to one that is busting with activities related to community redevelopment and eco-tourism. Since then, Taomi Village has seen vibrancy unprecedented since its glory days in the 1970s as an agricultural hub.

Administrative divisions
Tungmen, Pacheng, Pipa, Shuitou, Qilin, Zhuge, Xinan, Ximen, Nanmen, Beimen, Beian, Beimei, Taian, Danan, Wugong, Tongsheng, Qingxin, Xunhua, Dacheng, Lancheng, Taomi, Chenggong, Nancun, Ailan, Tieshan, Fangli, Xiangshan, Yixin, Gecheng, Guangcheng, Shigang, Fuxing and Niumian Village.

Economy
There is a TTL brewery in the township. One of the main economic activities in Puli is tourism. It is located in the mountainous center of Taiwan, and many tourist destination spots, such as Sun Moon Lake are nearby.

Education

 National Chi Nan University

Tourist attractions
 Chung Tai Chan Monastery
 Geographic center of Taiwan
 Hung Gee Bees Farm
 Knock on Wood Working
 Muh Sheng Museum of Entomology
 Liyutan

Transportation
Puli is at one end of National Highway 6 which provides a connection with west Taiwan towards Taichung and Nantou City.   At the eastern end of the Highway the Puli exit connects to the Hehuanshan mountain pass, at its highest point 3275 meters above sea level, before the road continues to Hualien on the east coast.  By this combination of roads, Puli is located along the only east-west coast to coast route crossing the central portion of the island.

Notable natives
 Chang Mei-yao, former actress
 Lin Cho-shui, writer, newspaper editor and politician
 Ma Wen-chun, member of Legislative Yuan
 Tsai Huang-liang, member of Legislative Yuan (1996-2016)

Other notable people
 Hsieh Ho-hsien, famous singer

References

External links

 Puli Town Hall, Nantou County 

Townships in Nantou County
Taiwan placenames originating from Formosan languages